Summacanthium is a genus of spiders in the family Cheiracanthiidae. It was first described in 2001 by Deeleman-Reinhold. , it contains 2 species from Indonesia.

References

Cheiracanthiidae
Araneomorphae genera
Spiders of Indonesia